Bridgman is a city in Berrien County in the U.S. state of Michigan. The population was 2,291 at the time of the 2010 census.

History
There was a place in this area known as Plummer's Pier. In 1856 lumbermen founded Charlotteville in this area.

Bridgman itself begins with the village of that name platted by George C. Bridgman in 1870. It was centered on a railroad station opened that year.

The Bridgman post office, with ZIP code 49106 opened with the name "Laketon" on November 11, 1862. The name changed to Bridgman on April 9, 1874. Bridgman later expanded by annexing the area that had previously been Charlotteville. The town is famous for being the location of the 1922 Bridgman Convention, a clandestine communist planning meeting in 1922 that was broken up by Federal Bureau of Investigation agents and local authorities.

Weko Beach 
Weko Beach is one of the key attractions of Bridgman. It is situated on the shores of Lake Michigan and is connected to Warren Dunes State Park on its South border. Visitors can walk from Weko Beach into Warren Dunes State Park, nearly three consecutive miles of beach.

Geography

Demographics

2010 census
As of the census of 2010, there were 2,291 people, 954 households, and 608 families living in the city. The racial makeup of the city was 95.3% White, 1.1% African American, 0.6% Native American, 1.0% Asian, 0.7% from other races, and 1.2% from two or more races. Hispanic or Latino of any race were 3.7% of the population.

There were 954 households, of which 28.1% had children under the age of 18 living with them, 49.9% were married couples living together, 10.3% had a female householder with no husband present, 3.6% had a male householder with no wife present, and 36.3% were non-families. 32.3% of all households were made up of individuals, and 13.7% had someone living alone who was 65 years of age or older. The average household size was 2.30 and the average family size was 2.88.

The median age in the city was 44.3 years. 22.1% of residents were under the age of 18; 6.1% were between the ages of 18 and 24; 22.6% were from 25 to 44; 28.6% were from 45 to 64; and 20.5% were 65 years of age or older. The gender makeup of the city was 47.5% male and 52.5% female.

2000 census
As of the census of 2000, there were 2,428 people, 998 households, and 649 families living in the city. The racial makeup of the city was 96.33% White, 0.70% African American, 0.37% Native American, 0.45% Asian, 0.04% Pacific Islander, 0.95% from other races, and 1.15% from two or more races. Hispanic or Latino of any race were 1.81% of the population.

There were 998 households, out of which 30.0% had children under the age of 18 living with them, 53.8% were married couples living together, 8.9% had a female householder with no husband present, and 34.9% were non-families. 31.9% of all households were made up of individuals, and 10.9% had someone living alone who was 65 years of age or older. The average household size was 2.31 and the average family size was 2.92.

In the city, the population was spread out, with 23.1% under the age of 18, 6.1% from 18 to 24, 26.9% from 25 to 44, 25.3% from 45 to 64, and 18.6% who were 65 years of age or older. The median age was 41 years. For every 100 females, there were 93.9 males. For every 100 females age 18 and over, there were 88.4 males.

The median income for a household in the city was $48,292, and the median income for a family was $56,466. Males had a median income of $40,862 versus $24,297 for females. The per capita income for the city was $25,405. About 4.7% of families and 6.9% of the population were below the poverty line, including 8.3% of those under age 18 and 5.8% of those age 65 or over.

Notable people 

 Herbert S. Gutowsky, chemist
 Ralf Mojsiejenko, German-born NFL player
 Jerry Planutis, NFL player; coach for the Michigan State Spartans and Bridgman High School

Further reading

References

Cities in Berrien County, Michigan
Michigan populated places on Lake Michigan
Populated places established in 1870
1870 establishments in Michigan